John Brown (21 April 1935 – 30 March 2019) was a British bobsledder and rugby player. He competed in the four-man event at the 1968 Winter Olympics.

References

External links
 

1935 births
2019 deaths
British male bobsledders
Olympic bobsledders of Great Britain
Bobsledders at the 1968 Winter Olympics
Sportspeople from London
20th-century British people